Latvian Canadians are Canadians of full or partial Latvian descent. At the 2011 census, there were about 27,355 people of Latvian descent in Canada.

History 
Although by 1921 the Canadian government considered all persons from the Baltic provinces to be Russians, it is known that there were some Latvians living in Canada in those years, because in 1961, 379 Latvian indicated that they had arrived in Canada prior to 1921, and most probably left Latvia after the 1905 Revolution. Between 1921 and 1945, 409 Latvians  arrived to Canada, although in the 1941 census listed 975 people claimed Latvian origin. 
After the Second World War in 1947, many Latvians moved to Canada as war refugees. This migration, which accounted for 92% of Latvians who immigrated to the country between 1921 and 1965, ended in 1957. Many of these Latvians worked in the agricultural areas during their first years in Canada, but soon settled in cities. By 1961, only 10% of those immigrants lived in rural zones and farms (6% in rural areas and 4% on farms). The majority of Latvian immigrants in Canada in 1991 were women, 775 more women than men.

Demography 
Although  before 1939, 78 percent of Latvians lived in the three prairie provinces, and only 12 percent in Ontario, since 1945 over 70 percent of Latvians live in Ontario and only about 10 percent in Quebec, while the prairie provinces have only had 11 percent of new Latvian immigrants. By 1991, 20,445 persons indicated they were of Latvian descent, most of them living in the capital, 14 percent in the prairie provinces, 12 percent in British Columbia, 5.9 percent in Quebec, and 1.8 percent in the Atlantic region.

In 1991 the largest populations of Latvian Canadians are in Toronto, Vancouver, Hamilton, Ottawa, and Montreal, Quebec.

Religion 
Most Latvian Canadians are Christians: close to 90 percent are Lutheran, 10 percent Roman Catholic, and 1 percent Baptist. The organization of Lutheran congregations in Canada is in regional dioceses, which belong to the Lutheran Evangelical Church in Exile. In 1970 there were 1,400 Latvian-Canadian Roman Catholics. On a parish basis they are connected to the larger Roman Catholic Church in Canada. In the Toronto archdiocese is The Association of Canadian Latvian Catholics, founded in 1949. On the other hand, Latvian Baptists are much less numerous in Canada: only 200. However they have a very active congregation in Toronto.

Notable people 
 Harry Adaskin, violinist, academic, and radio broadcaster
 Murray Adaskin, violinist, composer, conductor and teacher
 David Bezmozgis, writer and filmmaker
 Fred Bruemmer, nature photographer and researcher
 Sarmite Bulte, lawyer, advocate and politician
 Sylvia Burka, ice speed skater
 Ludmilla Chiriaeff, ballet dancer, choreographer, teacher, and company director
 Misha Cirkunov, current UFC fighter
 Peter Dreimanis, rock singer (July Talk)
 Kārlis Irbītis, aeroplane designer
 Henriette Ivanans, actress
 Miervaldis Jurševskis, chess master
 Jānis Kalniņš, composer and conductor
 Tālivaldis Ķeniņš, composer 
 Elizabeth Lazebnik, filmmaker
 Maris Martinsons, professor of management (top 2% scientist) and business consultant
 Andrew Podnieks, author and ice hockey historian 
 Imants Kārlis Ramiņš, composer, best known for his choral compositions
 Signe Ronka, figure skater
 Haralds Šnepsts, former professional ice hockey player
 Ksenia Solo, actress and former ballet dancer
 Katie Stelmanis, musician
 Pēteris Tabūns, politician
 Vaira Vīķe-Freiberga, professor and interdisciplinary scholar at the University of Montreal; 6th President of Latvia
 Moses Znaimer, founder of Citytv, executive of CHUM Limited and Zoomer Media

See also 

Canada–Latvia relations
Jewish Canadians

References

External links 
 Latvian Canadian Cultural Centre

European Canadian
 
Latvian diaspora
Latvian